Per Odensten (born 1938) is a Swedish novelist and poet. He made his literary debut in 1981 with the novel Gheel. Among his other novels are Vänterskans flykt from 2004, and Horntrollet from 2007. He was awarded the Dobloug Prize in 2000.

References

1938 births
Living people
20th-century Swedish novelists
20th-century Swedish poets
Dobloug Prize winners
Swedish male poets
Swedish male novelists
21st-century Swedish novelists
21st-century Swedish poets